The videography of South Korean singer G-Dragon, consists of 21 music videos, 5 concert tour videos, two vinyl LPs, and one documentary DVD. He has sold over 100,000 physical DVDs/Blu-rays in Japan and South Korea alone.

Music videos

As lead artist

Collaborations

Video albums

Concert tour videos

Documentaries

Other releases

Featured releases

Filmography

See also
 G-Dragon discography
 G-Dragon filmography

References

Videography
Videographies of South Korean artists